Ossian Jörgensen (26 June 1874 – 3 October 1948) was a Swedish sports shooter. He competed in three events at the 1908 Summer Olympics.

References

1874 births
1948 deaths
Swedish male sport shooters
Olympic shooters of Sweden
Shooters at the 1908 Summer Olympics
People from Jämtland